Nymphula definitalis is a moth in the family Crambidae. It was described by Strand in 1919. It is found in Taiwan.

References

Acentropinae
Moths described in 1919